United Nations Security Council Resolution 7, adopted on June 26, 1946, concerned the impact of Spain's dictatorship on international peace and security.  The Second World War had ended the year before.

The resolution was adopted in parts, and therefore no vote was taken on the text as a whole.

See also
List of United Nations Security Council Resolutions 1 to 100 (1946–1953)
United Nations Security Council Resolution 4
United Nations Security Council Resolution 10
Spanish Question (United Nations)

References

External links
 

 0007
20th century in Spain
Francoist Spain
 0007
1946 in Spain
June 1946 events